Reem is a feminine personal given name in Arabic meaning gazelle, which symbolizes purity and tenderness.
It has been used in Arabic poetry and literature as a symbol of a beautiful woman.

People

Reem
Reem Abdalazem (born 1992), Egyptian swimmer
Reem Abdullah (born 1987), Saudi Arabian actress
Reem Acra fashion designer born in Beirut, Lebanon
Reem Alabali-Radovan (born 1990), German-Iraqi politician
Reem Bassiouney (born 1973), Egyptian writer
Reem Al Hashimi, an Emirati Minister of State and managing director of the Dubai World Expo 2020 Bid Committee
Reem Abu Hassan, Minister of Social Development, Jordan
 Reem Kassis (born 1987), Palestinian-born American writer and cookbook author
Reem Maged (born 1974), Egyptian journalist
Reem Al Marzouqi (born 1990), Emirati engineer 
Reem Obeid, Lebanese footballer
Reem Shaikh (born 2002), Indian actress
Reem bint al-Waleed bin Talal (born 1983), Saudi Arabian royal and businesswoman
Reem bint Mohammed Al Saud, Saudi Arabian photographer, political journalist, and gallery owner

Rym
Princess Rym al-Ali ( born 1969), Algerian wife of Prince Ali bin Al Hussein of Jordan

See also
Reem (disambiguation)
Reema
Rima (disambiguation)

References

Arabic feminine given names